The Legend of William Tell (also Crossbow: The Legend of William Tell) is a 1990 video game published by Electronic Zoo, based on the TV series Crossbow. It was released for the Atari ST and Amiga.

Gameplay
The Legend of William Tell is a game in which the player guides William Tell through the countryside and Austrian tyrant Gessler's fortress.

Reception
Allen L. Greenberg reviewed the game for Computer Gaming World, and stated that "The Legend Of William Tell is a very limited product for adventure gamers and offers only a modicum of appeal to the action gamer."

Reviews
ACE (Advanced Computer Entertainment) - Apr, 1990
The Games Machine - Jan, 1990
ASM (Aktueller Software Markt) - Mar, 1990

References

External links
The Legend of William Tell at Atari Mania
The Legend of William Tell at Lemon Amiga

1990 video games
Action-adventure games
Amiga games
Atari ST games
Cultural depictions of William Tell
Video games based on television series
Video games developed in the United Kingdom
Video games set in Switzerland
Video games set in the Middle Ages